Michalis Triantafyllidis (born ) is a retired Greek male volleyball player. He has 365 appearances with Greece men's national volleyball team and he was part of the Greek team winning the bronze medal at the 1987 European Championship in Belgium. He played for Greek Olympiacos for 14 years (1980-1994).

Clubs
  Olympiacos (1980-1994)
  Panathinaikos (1994-1998)

References

External links
 Michalis Triantafyllidis at CEV official website
 Michalis Triantafyllidis career

1962 births
Living people
Greek men's volleyball players
Olympiacos S.C. players
Sportspeople from Piraeus